Ibryam Ibryam (Bulgarian: Ибрям Ибрям; born 12 January 2001) is a Bulgarian footballer who plays as a defender for Dobrudzha.

Career
Ibryam is a youth player of Spartak Varna, moving to the first team in 2020. On 22 July 2022 he completed his First League against Pirin helping his team to secure the first point in the league.

Career statistics

Club

References

External links
 

2001 births
Living people
Bulgarian footballers
Bulgaria youth international footballers
PFC Spartak Varna players
First Professional Football League (Bulgaria) players
Association football defenders